Masoud Mojdehi  is an Iranian football forward who played for Iran national football team. He also played for Taj SC.

Honours

Club
Takht Jamshid Cup
Winner: 1
1974–75 with Taj SC

Runner up: 1
1973–74 with Taj SC

Hazfi Cup
Winner: 1
1976–77 with Taj SC

References

External links
 
 Masoud Mojdehi at TeamMelli.com
 

Iran international footballers
Iranian footballers
1951 births
Living people
Esteghlal F.C. players
Association football forwards